Christopher John Truby (born December 9, 1973) is a  third baseman who played some of his career in Major League Baseball, though most of his time was spent in various teams' minor league systems. Chris is a 1992 graduate of Damien Memorial High School in Honolulu, Hawaii.

Playing career
Truby came up in 2000 with the Houston Astros. After hitting .260 with 11 home runs in 258 at bats his rookie season, he never matched his rookie totals. He has since played partial seasons with the Detroit Tigers, Montreal Expos, and Tampa Bay Devil Rays. His most recent MLB appearance came during the 2003 season. The Kansas City Royals signed Truby with the intention of having him play third base until prospect Mark Teahen was ready for full-time duty in the major leagues. However, Truby sustained a wrist injury in spring training and started the 2005 season on the disabled list.

Truby was a replacement player in 1995, before the 1994 Major League Baseball strike was resolved. After replacement players were no longer necessary, Truby spent the next five years playing for various Houston Astro's minor league teams before finally breaking through to the Major Leagues with the 2000 Astros. Truby last played for the Indianapolis Indians, the Triple-A affiliate of the Pittsburgh Pirates. On June 22, 2007, Truby announced his retirement from baseball as a player.

As a coach
In 2008, he took a coaching job in the Pirates minor league system, then was named as manager of the West Oahu CaneFires of Hawaii Winter Baseball.. From 2009-13, Truby managed in the Philadelphia Phillies system, with the Williamsport Crosscutters from 2009–10, the Lakewood BlueClaws in 2011 and the Clearwater Threshers from 2012-13. In 2014, Truby joined the staff of the Phillies parent club as the infield coordinator.  In January 2022, Truby was named the Minor League Infield Coordinator in the Pittsburgh Pirates organization.

References

External links
, or Retrosheet, or The Baseball Gauge, or Venezuela Winter League, or Minor League splits and situational stats

1973 births
Living people
Altoona Curve players
American expatriate baseball players in Canada
Auburn Astros players
Baseball coaches from California
Baseball players from California
Damien Memorial School alumni
Detroit Tigers players
Durham Bulls players
Gulf Coast Astros players
Houston Astros players
Indianapolis Indians players
Jackson Generals (Texas League) players
Kissimmee Cobras players
Las Vegas 51s players
Leones del Caracas players
American expatriate baseball players in Venezuela
Major League Baseball replacement players
Major League Baseball third basemen
Minor league baseball coaches
Minor league baseball managers
Montreal Expos players
Nashville Sounds players
New Orleans Zephyrs players
Omaha Royals players
Osceola Astros players
Quad Cities River Bandits players
Sportspeople from Palm Springs, California
Tampa Bay Devil Rays players
Toledo Mud Hens players